Manly Times is a Bulgarian drama film released in 1977, directed by Eduard Zahariev, starring Grigor Vachkov, Mariana Dimitrova, Velko Kanev and Pavel Popandov. The screenplay, written by Nikolay Haytov is based on the short stories Manly Times and Wedding from his book Wild Stories (1967).

In a colourful folklore manner, the movie presents an old tradition of stealing girls for brides that was a reputable occupation in the Rhodope Mountains region. The interaction between a brilliant literature and skilful directing as well as the memorable performances by Vachkov and Dimitrova received a broad critical acclaim and turned the film into one of the classics of the Bulgarian cinematography.

Cast
Grigor Vachkov as Banko (the stealing women expert)
Mariana Dimitrova as Elitsa (the stolen girl)
Velko Kanev as Velko (candidate husband) 
Pavel Popandov as Dinko
Nikola Todev as Kara Kolyo
Teofil Badelov as Gelyo
Trayan Yankov as Ilcho
Georgi Dimitrov as Petko

References

Sources

External links
 
 Manly Times at the Bulgarian National Television 

1977 films
1970s historical drama films
Bulgarian historical drama films
1970s Bulgarian-language films
Films directed by Eduard Sachariev